Leslie Ayvazian is an Armenian award-winning playwright and character actress.

Biography 
Ayvazian is the recipient of the Roger L. Stevens (1994) and Susan Smith Blackburn Prize (1996) for her work Nine Armenians, which was produced at Manhattan Theatre Club. She also received a fellowship from the New Jersey Council of the Arts and assistance from the New Harmony Writers Project in developing the play. Her numerous works have been produced off-Broadway, in major regional theatres, and in Poland and Slovakia. Most recently, the Atlantic Theater Company produced her play "Make Me" as part of their 2008-2009 Stage 2 season.

In addition to her writing achievements, Ayvazian is an accomplished actress and teacher. She has also appeared in the films Working Girl, Alice and Regarding Henry, and is a recurring guest star in the Law and Order franchise.

Ayvazian is currently an adjunct professor at the graduate school of Columbia University.

Plays
Deaf Day
High Dive
Lovely Day
Mama Drama
Nine Armenians
Plan Day
Singer's Boy
Twenty Four Years
Make Me
Lost in Yonkers
A Naked Girl on the Appian Way
High Dive

Selected filmography
Working Girl (1988), as Dewey Stone Reception Guest
Me and Him (1988), as Paramedic
Ask Me Again (1989), as Maxine
Alice (1990), uncredited
Regarding Henry (1991), uncredited

TV appearances
CBS Schoolbreak Special
Flour Babies (1990), as Mrs. Emerson
American Playhouse
The Sunset Gang (The Home segment, 1991)Law & OrderJurisdiction (1993), as KorolekHouse Counsel (1995), as Priscilla LempertHomesick (1996), as Mrs. KarmelLaw & Order: Criminal IntentGone (2005), as Ruth StocktonLaw & Order: Special Victims Unit, as Judge ValderaLimitations (2000)Baby Killer (2000)Abuse (2001)Ridicule (2001)Resilience (2002)The JuryMail Order Mystery'' (2004), as Lynette Bradwell

References

External links
Armenian General Benevolent Union
Broadway World entry
Doollee database

New Jersey Theater
1994 Roger L. Stevens Awards
Susan Smith Blackburn Prize

Year of birth missing (living people)
Living people
Columbia University faculty
American film actresses
American television actresses
20th-century American actresses
American women academics
21st-century American women